Humanitas is an independent Romanian publishing house, founded on February 1, 1990 (after the Romanian Revolution) in Bucharest by the philosopher Gabriel Liiceanu, based on a  state-owned publishing house, Editura Politică. Its slogan is Humanitas, bunul gust al libertăţii ("Humanitas, the good taste of freedom").

During its first years, Humanitas mainly published authors from the Romanian diaspora, whose works had been subject to censorship or banning in Communist Romania; they include Emil Cioran, Mircea Eliade, and Eugène Ionesco.

Currently, Humanitas publishes literature, books on philosophy, religion, social and political sciences, history, memoirs, popular science, children's literature, and self-help books.

Main Romanian authors published by Humanitas
 Lucian Blaga
 Lucian Boia
 Mircea Cărtărescu
 Emil Cioran
 Lena Constante
 Petru Creţia
 Neagu Djuvara
 Mircea Eliade
 Paul Goma
 Virgil Ierunca
 Eugène Ionesco
 Gabriel Liiceanu
 Monica Lovinescu
 Constantin Noica
 Ion Mihai Pacepa
 Horia-Roman Patapievici
 Andrei Pleșu
 Queen Anne of Romania
 Dumitru Stăniloae

References

External links
  Humanitas publishing house
  Humanitas Fiction
  Humanitas Multimedia
  Librariile Humanitas

Publishing companies established in 1990
Companies based in Bucharest
Book publishing companies of Romania
Mass media in Bucharest